Lee Paul Roche (born 28 October 1980) is an English former professional footballer. He played as a right sided full-back but could also play on the right of midfield.

Club career

Manchester United
Roche started his career as a trainee at Manchester United but made only one substitute appearance in the league against Newcastle United. He also started a League Cup game against Arsenal and a Champions League tie against Deportivo la Coruna. During his time with the 'Red Devils' the young full-back was loaned out to Wrexham for the 2000–01 season, and was a key member of the team for the entire season, playing in 41 of the 46 league games.

Burnley
At the end of 2003 Roche was released on a free transfer from Manchester United. Burnley were the team to take advantage of this situation with then manager Stan Ternent using his connections to the Old Trafford club to sign the promising youngster to a two-year deal.

In his first season, Roche wasn't a first team regular, despite scoring an outstanding 25-yard volley against Crystal Palace on his debut which although credited to him was a clear own goal. Towards the end of the 2003–04 season though, he began to push the previous right back, Dean West out of the side. Unfortunately for Roche, Ternent's contract wasn't renewed and Steve Cotterill was appointed as the new manager at Turf Moor. Cotterill did not rate Roche as highly as Ternent had done, and brought in Mike Duff from Cheltenham Town instead. Roche still featured in the team fairly regularly though, but out of position on the right side of midfield where he looked much less comfortable. Roche scored his only other Burnley goal in a famous 2–1 victory at Elland Road against Leeds United.

Wrexham
After his two-year contract with Burnley expired, Roche returned to play for Wrexham in the summer of 2005. He scored on his second debut for the club against Boston United. At the end of the 2006–07 season Roche was released by Wrexham after a disappointing season in which they just avoided relegation to the Football Conference.

Later career
He joined Droylsden  in 2007, staying with the club until February 2011.

International career
Roche made one appearance for the England under-21s; he started the 2−2 draw with Finland during qualifying for the 2002 UEFA European Under-21 Championship.

Retirement
Following a sequence of injuries and falling out of love with the game, Roche retired from football at age 27. He now works as a plumber and cavity wall remover and also coaches the Bury F.C. under-11 side.

References

External links

1980 births
Living people
Footballers from Bolton
English footballers
Association football defenders
Manchester United F.C. players
Wrexham A.F.C. players
Burnley F.C. players
Droylsden F.C. players
Premier League players
English Football League players
National League (English football) players